Big Otter Mill, also known as Forbes Mill, is a historic grist mill located near Bedford, Bedford County, Virginia, USA. It was built about 1920 and is a large, 2½-story, mortise-and-tenon framed mill building, topped by an unusual and picturesque mansard roof. The mill retains a nearly complete set of early-20th century machinery, including a 13-feet diameter water wheel, which was used until the late 1940s. Also on the property are a contributing mill race and the foundation of a store. The building is under restoration as a mill museum.

It was listed on the National Register of Historic Places in 1998.

References

External links
Big Otter Mill website

Mill museums in Virginia
Grinding mills on the National Register of Historic Places in Virginia
Industrial buildings completed in 1920
Buildings and structures in Bedford County, Virginia
National Register of Historic Places in Bedford County, Virginia
Museums in Bedford County, Virginia
Grinding mills in Virginia
1920 establishments in Virginia